The 2020 Rose Bowl Game was a college football bowl game played on January 1, 2020, with kickoff at 5:00 p.m. EST (2:00 p.m. local PST) on ESPN. It was the 106th edition of the Rose Bowl Game, and one of the 2019–20 bowl games concluding the 2019 FBS football season. Sponsored by the Northwestern Mutual financial services organization, the game was officially known as the Rose Bowl Game presented by Northwestern Mutual, and was a rematch of the 2012 Rose Bowl, which Oregon also won. Wisconsin made it to their first Rose Bowl since 2013; the game marked the Badgers' fourth consecutive Rose Bowl loss, having lost three straight times from 2011 to 2013.

Teams
The game matched Big Ten Conference runner-up Wisconsin and Pac-12 Conference champion Oregon. The 2012 Rose Bowl featured the same teams, won by Oregon, who scored 10 unanswered fourth-quarter points in a 45–38 victory.

Oregon Ducks

Oregon entered the game with an 11–2 record (8–1 in conference). They finished atop the Pac-12's North Division, then defeated Utah in the Pac-12 Championship Game to secure their spot in the Rose Bowl. Oregon was 2–1 against ranked FBS opponents, defeating Washington and Utah while losing to Auburn. The Ducks' only other loss was to Arizona State. This was Oregon's eighth Rose Bowl; they had a 3–4 record in prior appearances, last playing in the 2015 edition, which they won over Florida State.

Wisconsin Badgers

Wisconsin entered the game with a 10–3 record (7–2 in conference). They finished tied with Minnesota atop the Big Ten's West Division, and advanced to the Big Ten Championship Game due to their regular season win over Minnesota. In the Big Ten title game, the Badgers fell to Ohio State, 34–21. As Ohio State was selected for the College Football Playoff, Wisconsin received an invitation to the Rose Bowl. The Badgers were 3–2 against ranked opponents, defeating Michigan, Iowa, and Minnesota while losing to Ohio State twice. Their only other loss was to Illinois. This was Wisconsin's tenth Rose Bowl; they had a 3–6 record in prior appearances, last playing in the 2013 edition, which they lost to Stanford.

Game summary

Statistics

Some controversy arose from an offensive pass interference call that went against Wisconsin near the end of the game, which nullified a Wisconsin first down and eventually gave the ball back to Oregon, who was able to run the clock down and win the game. The call and its impact on the game led former NFL referee Terry McAulay to publicly disagree with the call.

References

External links
 Game statistics at statbroadcast.com

Rose Bowl
Rose Bowl Game
Oregon Ducks football bowl games
Wisconsin Badgers football bowl games
Rose Bowl
Rose Bowl
21st century in Pasadena, California